Ahmadabad-e Dinarak (also Romanized as Aḩmadābād-e Dīnarāk; also known as Aḩmadābād and Aḩmadābād-e Barakeh) is a village in Qaleh-ye Khvajeh Rural District, in the Central District of Andika County, Khuzestan Province, Iran. At the 2006 census, its population was 323, in 65 families.

References 

Populated places in Andika County